"Ramble Tamble" is a song written by John Fogerty and recorded by Creedence Clearwater Revival. It was released on the band's fifth studio album, Cosmo's Factory, in 1970. It is known for its lengthy instrumental section and tempo changes.

The song has been singled out for critical praise, with music journalist Steven Hyden calling it "the most rockin' song of all time."  Allmusic critic Stephen Thomas Erlewine described it as a "claustrophobic, paranoid rocker" whose lengthy instrumental section "was dramatic and had a direction," unlike some others.  Brett Milano of udiscovermusic.com rated Fogerty's guitar solo as one of the 100 all-time greatest, stating that "he poured on the tension and the distortion, delivering a monster sound from the deep swamps."  On the other hand, Rolling Stone Magazine critic John Grissim considered "Ramble Tamble" to be the only "unsatisfying" song on Cosmo's Factory.

"Ramble Tamble" developed from parts of the original version of an earlier Creedence Clearwater Revival song, "Commotion". A southern rock song, it begins and ends with rockabilly elements, and contains a psychedelic rock breakdown lasting four minutes.

References

Creedence Clearwater Revival songs
Space rock songs
1970 songs